William John Yerrick (February 26, 1874 – September 8, 1936) was a professional baseball pitcher. He played parts of two seasons in Major League Baseball for the Boston Beaneaters in 1895-96.

References

External links

Major League Baseball pitchers
Boston Beaneaters players
Salem (minor league baseball) players
Portland (minor league baseball) players
Wilkes-Barre Coal Barons players
Rochester Brownies players
Montreal Royals players
Baseball players from Pennsylvania
People from Danville, Pennsylvania
1874 births
1936 deaths
19th-century baseball players